Timothy MacKenzie Gunn (born July 29, 1953) is an American author, academic, and television personality. He served on the faculty of Parsons School of Design from 1982 to 2007 and was chair of fashion design at the school from August 2000 to March 2007, after which he joined Liz Claiborne (now Kate Spade & Company) as its chief creative officer. Over 16 seasons, Gunn has become well known as the on-air mentor to designers on the reality television program Project Runway. Gunn's popularity on Project Runway led to two spin-off shows; Bravo's Tim Gunn's Guide to Style and Lifetime's Under the Gunn, as well as five books. In addition to being an executive producer, Gunn has served as mentor for the teen designers on Project Runway: Junior. He also provides the voice of Baileywick, the castle steward in the Disney Junior television show Sofia the First and narrated the sitcom Mixology.

Early life
Gunn was born in Washington, D.C. His father worked in the FBI where he started off as an agent but transitioned into becoming a ghostwriter and speechwriter for J. Edgar Hoover. Gunn attended the Corcoran College of Art and Design, receiving a BFA in sculpture.

Gunn, who had identified as gay, was raised in an intensely homophobic household where homosexuals were viewed as predators. According to a video Gunn created for the It Gets Better Project, he attempted suicide at the age of 17 by swallowing over 100 pills. He denied his sexual orientation until his early 20s, and did not share it with his family until he came out to his sister when he was 29.

Career
After serving as director of admissions for the Corcoran, Gunn started working at Parsons in 1982, served as associate dean from 1989 to 2000, and then became Fashion Design Department chair in August 2000. He was credited with "retooling and invigorating the curriculum for the 21st century."

Gunn began appearing on Project Runway during its first season in 2004, and is known for his catchphrase  "Make it work."  Gunn received a Primetime Emmy Award in 2013 for Outstanding Host For A Reality Or Reality-Competition Program. Tim Gunn's Guide to Style, a reality show in which Gunn gives fashion advice, debuted in September 2007 on the Bravo television network. This show ran for a total of 16 episodes over two seasons. Then starting in January 2014 Gunn was the host on a single 13–episode season of Lifetime's Under the Gunn. Gunn is an executive producer for Project Runway: Junior. He is also the teen designers' mentor.

Gunn also played a version of himself as a reporter for the fictional Fashion TV in two episodes of ABC's  Ugly Betty in February 2007 and later guest starred on Drop Dead Diva in August 2009 as himself.

Gunn left Parsons in 2007 and joined Liz Claiborne, Inc. as the company's chief creative officer in March of that year.

In April 2007, Abrams Image Publishers released Gunn's book A Guide to Quality, Taste and Style, co-written with Kate Moloney, cover photo by Markus Klinko & Indrani. While on tour in Palm Springs, California, the nearby city of Palm Desert honored him with an official resolution declaring April 27, 2007 (the day of his visit) Timothy M. Gunn Day. He was also presented with a certificate by the city of Palm Springs and a plaque by the nearby city of Rancho Mirage in recognition of his career achievements. From 2010 to 2015 Gunn published four additional books (listed below).

In May 2009, Gunn served as commencement speaker at the Corcoran College of Art and Design, and received an honorary doctorate from the institution.

He made sporadic appearances on The Late Late Show with Craig Ferguson "Dear Aquaman" segments, helping or standing in for Aquaman (Ferguson), answering letters and dispensing advice.

He guest starred as Barney's personal tailor on several episodes of How I Met Your Mother.

Gunn guest starred as himself on the 6th episode of CW's fourth season of Gossip Girl, "Easy J".

On September 7, 2018, it was confirmed that Gunn, along with Heidi Klum would not be returning to Project Runway for a 17th season on Bravo as they both signed a deal to host a fashion competition show on Amazon Video titled Making the Cut. Making the Cut released its third season in the summer of 2022.

In other media
In August 2007, "Tim Gunn's Podcast (a reality chamber opera)" by Jeffrey Lependorf premiered at the Cornelia Street Cafe in Manhattan. It received its first run one year later at New York International Fringe Festival.

Gunn appeared in a backup story in the first issue of Models Inc., a fashion-themed comic book miniseries published by Marvel Comics that debuted in September 2009 to coincide with New York City's style showcase. Gunn appeared on a variant cover of the issue illustrated by Phil Jimenez. In the series, which is written by Project Runway fan Mark Sumerak and illustrated by Jimenez, Gunn dons the Iron Man armor to foil an attack against the New York Fashion Museum.

Gunn appeared in the opening skit on the 62nd Primetime Emmy Awards to style Jimmy Fallon to look like Bruce Springsteen, from his Born in the U.S.A. album.

In 2014, he participated in Do I Sound Gay?, a documentary film by David Thorpe about stereotypes of gay men's speech patterns.

Tim Gunn appears in Kate McKinnon's audio drama "Heads Will Roll".

Personal life

Gunn lives in Manhattan. In a 2006 interview with Instinct, Gunn stated that he had not been in a relationship since the early 1980s, following the abrupt end of a six-year relationship when his boyfriend cheated on him, and that he still loves his former partner, though they are not in contact. In a 2010 interview with People magazine, he said, "For a long time, I didn't know what I was. I knew what I wasn't: I wasn't interested in boys, and I really wasn't interested in girls." He mentioned he has "always been kind of asexual." Gunn spoke about his celibacy in 2012. He later stated that he is unashamed of this fact saying, "Do I feel like less of a person for it? No... I'm a perfectly happy and fulfilled individual." He said he started his self-imposed celibacy as AIDS began ravaging the gay community, and that he and many other people simply retreated.

Gunn is an outspoken critic of clothing designs using animal fur. In 2008, he narrated a video about rabbit fur farming in China for animal rights group PETA. He termed the treatment of animals used for fur as "egregiously irresponsible".

Gunn endorsed Christine Quinn's candidacy for Mayor of New York City in the 2013 mayoral election.

Awards and honors 
In June 2020, in honor of the 50th anniversary of the first LGBTQ Pride parade, Queerty named him among the fifty heroes “leading the nation toward equality, acceptance, and dignity for all people”.

Filmography

Project Runway (2004–2017, TV series) as Himself
Drinks with LX (2006) as Himself
Ugly Betty (2007, TV series) as Fashion TV Reporter
Tim Gunn's Guide to Style (2007–2008, TV series) as Himself
American Dad! (2008) as Himself (voice)
The Replacements (2008, TV series) as Himself (voice)
Drop Dead Diva (2009, TV series) as Tim Gunn
Project Runway: All-Star Challenge (2009, TV Special) as Himself - Mentor
The Biggest Loser: Second Chances (2009, TV series)
How I Met Your Mother (2010–2014, TV series) as Himself
Sex and the City 2 (2010) as Himself
Gossip Girl (2010, TV series) as Himself
Teen Spirit (2011, TV Movie) as Supervisor J-3
The Smurfs (2011) as Henri
The Revolution (2012, TV series) as Himself - Co-Host
The Cleveland Show (2012, TV series) as Himself (voice) Episode: "Turkey Pot Die"
Sofia the First: Once Upon a Princess (2012, TV Movie) as Baileywick (voice)
Sofia the First (2013–2018, TV series) as Baileywick (voice)
Sesame Street (2013, TV series) as William 'Bill' Ding
Family Guy (2013, TV series) as Himself (voice) Episode: "Save the Clam"
Mixology (2014, TV series) as Himself
Under the Gunn (2014) as Himself
Hollywood Game Night (2014, TV series) as Himself
Inside Amy Schumer (2015, TV series) as Willenby
Project Runway: Junior (2015–2016, TV series)
The Real O'Neals (2016, TV series) as Himself
Bill Nye Saves the World (2017, TV series) as Himself
Mickey and the Roadster Racers (2017, TV series) as Robbie Roberts (voice)
BoJack Horseman (2017, TV series) as Himself
Making the Cut (2020–present; Himself and executive producer)
Scooby-Doo and Guess Who? (2020 TV series) as Himself

Published works

See also
 LGBT culture in New York City
 List of LGBT people from New York City

References

External links

Lifetime TV's Project Runway official website
Chicago Tribune (December 1, 2005): "A chat with Tim Gunn of 'Project Runway'" 
The New York Times (Apr. 12, 2007): "The Headmaster of Fashion"
 Interview: Sarah's Backstage Pass: Sarah Adamson "Style for the Suburban Woman"
 Interview: Palm Springs Life Magazine: R. Christian Anderson "Style Tips for Summer: Tim Gunn Offers Advice for the Desert"

1953 births
Asexual men
Male actors from Washington, D.C.
American male voice actors
Businesspeople from Washington, D.C.
Living people
American LGBT writers
Parsons School of Design faculty
George Washington University Corcoran School alumni
Fashion stylists
American LGBT broadcasters
LGBT people from Washington, D.C.
Participants in American reality television series
Primetime Emmy Award winners
American fashion businesspeople
Writers from Washington, D.C.
Project Runway (American series)